Ultimate or Ultimates may refer to:

Arts, entertainment, and media

Music

Albums
Ultimate (Jolin Tsai album)
Ultimate (Pet Shop Boys album)
Ultimate!, an album by The Yardbirds
The Ultimate (Bryan Adams Album), a compilation album by Bryan Adams
Ultimate Prince or just Ultimate, an album by Prince

Songs
"Ultimate" (Denzel Curry song), a song by Denzel Curry from the double EP 32 Zel/Planet Shrooms
"Ultimate", a song by Lindsay Lohan from the Freaky Friday soundtrack

Video games
Super Smash Bros. Ultimate, often referred to as simply Ultimate.
Ultimate General, a series of computer games recreating the American Civil War
Ultimate Play the Game or just Ultimate, a video game developer, now known as Rare

Other uses in arts,  entertainment, and media
Ultimate (roller coaster), at Lightwater Valley amusement park near Ripon, North Yorkshire, England
Ultimates, a fictional superhero group in the Marvel Comics universe

Philosophy
The Ultimate (philosophy), the concept of an unconditional reality in metaphysics or theology

Sport
Ultimate (sport), a flying-disc team sport

Technology
Ultimate 10-200, a Canadian aerobatic biplane design
Windows 7 Ultimate, a marketing edition of Windows 7
Windows Vista Ultimate, a marketing edition of Windows Vista

See also
The Ultimate Collection (disambiguation)
Ultima (disambiguation)
Ultimo (disambiguation)